Denizli Bus Terminal is the intercity bus terminal of Denizli, Turkey. It was demolished in 2011, rebuilt in 2014 and reopened on March 9, 2014. During the period from 2011 to 2014, EGS Park, located approximately 6 kilometers away from the city center, was temporarily used as the terminal service. The terminal has 33 platforms for buses. It is located on the same boulevard as Denizli railway station.

Bus connections
Denizli Ulaşım
 120 - Karşıyaka - Valilik - Kervansaray
 121 - Karşıyaka - Valilik - Çınar
 130 - Teleferik - Çınar
 150 - Otogar - Ulus Cad. - Kampüs
 160 - 3.Sanayi - Kayıhan
 170 - Otogar - Sokak Hayvanları Kliniği
 191 - Otogar - Cankurtaran
 210 - Valilik - Pınarkent
 211 - Valilik - Güzelköy Kavşağı
 220 - Toki - Çınar - Aktepe
 230 - Otogar - Pamukkale
 240 - Otogar - Kale - Kocadere
 250 - Eskihisar - Çamlık - Kampüs
 251 - Eskihisar - Lise
 260 - Otogar - Bozburun - Salihağa
 270 - Valilik - Irlıganlı - Eldenizli
 300 - Karahasanlı - Üniversite - Bağbaşı
 301 - Karahasanlı - Hal Kavş. - Çınar
 360 - Otogar - Lise-Babadağ Toki
 420 - Otogar - Üzerlik - Aşağışamlı
 440 - Valilik-Gümüşler - Servergazi Hast.
 530 - Otogar - Yenişehir
 800 - Otogar - Çınar - Akkonak
 801 - Otogar - Hastane - Gezekyatağı

References 

Bus terminal
Bus stations in Turkey
2014 establishments in Turkey
Transport infrastructure completed in 2014
Public transport in Turkey